Eilema croceibasis is a moth of the subfamily Arctiinae. It was described by Hervé de Toulgoët in 1955. It is found on Madagascar.

The larvae feed on lichens.

References

croceibasis
Moths described in 1955